The Hurricane Relief T20 Challenge was a Twenty20 International (T20I) cricket match that took place in England on 31 May 2018. The West Indies cricket team played against a World XI team, to raise funds for stadiums damaged by Hurricane Irma and Hurricane Maria in September 2017. The damaged stadiums were Ronald Webster Park in Anguilla and Dominica's Windsor Park.

The International Cricket Council (ICC) granted the fixture international status, with Lord's being selected as venue to host the match. In March 2018, the ICC named Eoin Morgan as the captain of the World XI side. The following month, Carlos Brathwaite was named as the captain of the West Indies team. However, two days before the match, Morgan was ruled out of the fixture with a fractured finger, and replaced as captain by Shahid Afridi.

The West Indies won the one-off match by 72 runs.

Squads

Shakib Al Hasan was originally named in the World XI team, but withdrew for personal reasons and was replaced with Sandeep Lamichhane. Hardik Pandya was ruled out of the match with a viral illness, and was replaced by Mohammed Shami.
Eoin Morgan fractured a finger two days before the game, so had to withdraw from the squad  and was replaced by Sam Billings. Sam Curran was added to the squad at the same time, but the next day was called up by the England team for their Test against Pakistan, which started the day after the Lord's game.

Only T20I

References

External links
 Series home at ESPN Cricinfo

2018 in West Indian cricket
International cricket competitions in 2018
West Indian cricket tours of England
Charity events in the United Kingdom